Magika is a 2010 Malaysian film directed by Edry Abdul Halim.

Plot
Ayu and Malik, two siblings are going through their darkest moments of lives when their beloved mother just died. Malik feels so depressed believing that he was the main cause of his mother's death. During one of the evenings after a fight with his sister, Malik left to take a stroll in the forest. On and on he went until he realised he was lost and the next very moment, he appeared in another dimension called Magika.

Not only had he gotten himself lost, he was captured by a Nenek Kebayan and her follower, Awang Kenit. He is now subjected to be used as an experiment by the Nenek Kebayan to produce Essence of Youth made of human child's tears. Upon hearing Malik's cries for help, Ayu rushed to help her brother and she too is sucked in the Magika mystical land.

Ayu had to endure various types of challenges and obstacles to find and save her brother in her journey in the Magika world. And so begins the encounters of both the siblings with famous Malay heroes and myths like Badang, Dragon of Chini Lake, Nenek Kebayan, Puteri Bunian, Pak Pandir, Hang Tuah and the Warriors of Malacca, Mount Ledang Princess, Bawang Putih and a lot more characters, all of whom communicate with each other in song.

Cast
 Diana Danielle as Ayu 
 Mawi as Bad 
 Fimie Don as Malik 
 Ziana Zain as Nenek Kebayan 
 Ning Baizura as Puteri Gunung Ledang
 Maya Karin as Bunian
 Raja Azura as Mak Andeh 
 Norman Abdul Halim as Pokok Bersaudara 1
 Edry Abdul Halim as Pokok Bersaudara 2
 Yusry Abdul Halim as Pokok Bersaudara 3
 Aznil Nawawi as Pak Pandir 
 M. Nasir as the Chini Lake dragon 
 Jalaluddin Hassan as Murad 
 Ogy Ahmad Daud as Ija 
 Sharifah Amani as Bawang Putih
 Sharifah Aleya as Bawang Merah 
 Adibah Noor as Makcik Halia 
 Ruminah Sidek as Tok Wan 
 Sabri Yunus as the Bendahara 
 Saiful Apek as Hang Tuah
 Lan Pet Pet as Hang Jebat 
 Azlee Jaafar as Hang Kasturi 
 Hamdan Ramli as Hang Lekir 
 Ilya Buang as Hang Lekiu 
 Vanida Imran as Mahsuri
 Norman Hakim as Awang Lembing 
 Nabil Ahmad as Orang Minyak
 Zaibo as Pak Belalang 
 Hadziq as Belalang 
 Marsha Milan Londoh as Puteri Santubong 
 Azhari Zain as the Doctor

References

External links
 

Malaysian musical films
Malay-language films
2010 films
KRU Studios films